Annamaria Lusardi is an Italian-born economist and the Denit Trust Distinguished Scholar and Professor of Economics and Accountancy at The George Washington University School of Business. In 2011 she founded and continues to serve as the Academic Director of the Global Financial Literacy Excellence Center. Her interests focus on financial literacy and financial education.

Education 
Annamaria Lusardi studied at Bocconi University, located in Milan, Italy. In 1986 she graduated with a BA in economics. Lusardi continued her studies in the United States at Princeton University, where she earned a PhD in economics in 1992.

Career 
After graduating from Princeton, Lusardi taught economics at Princeton University, the University of Chicago Harris School of Public Policy, the University of Chicago Booth School of Business, and Columbia Business School. She also taught at Dartmouth College since 1992 as an Associate Professor of Economics. In 2006, Lusardi became a Professor Economics at Dartmouth. From 2009 to 2019, she was the Joel Z. and Susan Hyatt Professor of Economics at Dartmouth. In 2010, Lusardi began working at the George Washington School of Business where she is a chair professor. Since 2014, Lusardi has served as the Denit Trust Distinguished Scholar and Professor of Economics and Accountancy at the School of Business.  Lusardi is  the director of the George Washington University Financial Literacy Center, a joint initiative between Dartmouth College, the RAND corporation, and the Wharton School.  In 2014 she was elected chair of the Research Committee of the Organization for Economic Co-operation and Development/International Network on Financial Education. 

Lusardi served as the faculty advisor to the office of Financial Education of the U.S. Treasury from September to December in 2009. Additionally, Lusardi testified to the lack of financial capability and literacy among Americans and the necessity of financial education in high schools before the U.S. Subcommittee on Children and Families of the Senate Committee on Health, Education, Labor, and Pensions. Italy also sought Lusardi's advice. In 2017, Lusardi was appointed as the director of the Committee for Financial Education.

Teaching 
Annamaria Lusardi has a focus in the field of Economics, Financial Literacy and Financial Education. She is a current professor at The George Washington University School of Business teaching Financial Decision Making - Implication for the consumer and professional, Macroeconomics for the Global Economy, and Personal Financial Management. She shows the theoretical and empirical implications of financial illiteracy on an economy. She also uses her expertise in retirement and estate planning in showing the contrast between financial literacy and illiteracy.

Awards and honors
In 2013, Lusardi received the William E. Odom Visionary Leadership Award from the Jump$tart Coalition for Personal Financial Literacy, and the National Numeracy Network's inaugural 2012 Steen Award. She is the recipient of the Fidelity Pyramid Prize, a $50,000 award to authors of published applied research that best helps address the goal of improving lifelong financial well-being for Americans. The University of Vaasa (Finland) awarded her an honorary degree of Economics and Business Administration in 2019. 
She has also received awards or scholarships from FINRA, SABE, Skandia and Williams A. Forbes.

Selected publications 

(Awarded the Fidelity Pyramid Prize.)

References

External links 
Global Financial Literacy Excellence Center webpage
On Google Scholar: Annamaria Lusardi

Living people
Italian economists
Italian women economists
Princeton University alumni
Bocconi University alumni
George Washington University faculty
George Washington University School of Business faculty
Year of birth missing (living people)